The Dead is the seventh album by the American deathrock band, Theatre of Ice.

Musicians
Brent Johnson - Vocals, Guitars, Effects, Percussion
Dale Garrard - Guitars, Vocals, Keyboards, Drums

Track listing
Dead Moon Rising
Losing Proposition
Neath the Stares
Dark Angels
Termination
Black Leather/Blonde Sin
Rattle
Never Be the Same Again
Now it Begins to Begin
Lust and Lucky
Cemetery Drive
Talkin About the Dead
On The Dark Path
Dead Moon Descending

Reception

References

1987 albums
Theatre of Ice albums